All Out War is an American metalcore band from Newburgh, New York, formed in 1991. They have released seven full-length albums starting in 1997.

Career
The band played their first show together in Newburgh, New York at the Hudson Valley skate park in 1991. A riot broke out resulting in the police intervening. The lineup was Darryl Quirk, Sam Carbone, Tom Connelly (three members from A.W.O.L., an earlier hardcore band from Newburgh, N.Y.) and Mike Score.
They are sometimes credited with having formed in 1993. The band's lineup shifted frequently in its early years before their first full-length release Truth in the Age of Lies on the German record label Gain Ground in 1997.  Later in 1997 the band signed with the Chicago based record label Victory Records, where they released their second album For Those Who Were Crucified in 1998.

Turmoil within the band continued in the years following the release of For Those Who Were Crucified with multiple band members entering and leaving the band.  The band returned to the studio in 2003 to record their third full length, Condemned to Suffer, which was also released on Victory Records.  In 2004 the band announced that they had officially broken up due to the inability of vocalist Mike Score to continue with the band.

All Out War reunited in 2006,
and released their fourth album Assassins in the House of God (2007).  By early 2008 the band had left Victory Records. However, by early 2010, All Out War had returned to the record label and recorded Into the Killing Fields, which was released in August 2010. In late June 2015, All Out War released a new EP, Dying Gods, on Organized Crime Records. In early February 2023, they released a more Blackened hardcore offering, Celestial Rot on Translation Loss.

Current members
 Mike Score – vocals
 Erik Carrillo – bass
 Taras Apuzzo – guitar
 Andy Pietroloungo – guitar
 Jesse Sutherland – drums

Discography
 "Destined to Burn" 7" [Hardway Records] (1994)
 "Hymns of the Apocalypse" 7" [Trip Machine Laboratories] (2008)
 Philly Dust Krew [Too Damn Hype] (1994)
 Truth in the Age of Lies [Gain Ground] (1997)
 For Those Who Were Crucified [Victory Records] (1998)
 Condemned to Suffer [Victory Records] (2003)
 Assassins in the House of God [Victory Records] (2007)
 Into the Killing Fields [Victory Records] (2010)
 Truth in the Age of Lies [Organized Crime Records] (2012)
 "1992 Demo (aka Sum of All Fears)" 10" [Organized Crime Records] (2012)
 Dying Gods (EP) [Organized Crime Records] (2015)
 Give Us Extinction [Organized Crime Records] (2017)
 Crawl Among the Filth [Unbeaten Records] (2019)
 Celestial Rot (2023)

References

External links
 All Out War on Myspace

Metalcore musical groups from New York (state)
Victory Records artists
Hardcore punk groups from New York (state)
Crossover thrash groups
American thrash metal musical groups